Martin Akers is a former association football player who represented New Zealand at international level.

Akers made a solitary official international appearance for New Zealand in a 0–5 loss to Indonesia on 21 September 1997.

References 

1968 births
Living people
New Zealand association footballers
New Zealand international footballers
National Soccer League (Australia) players
Wollongong Wolves FC players
Association football forwards